Christopher Stephen Clark (born 29 August 1979) is a British electronic musician, performing under the mononym Clark. He has produced music for his own albums, as well as music for television, films and video games, having composed scores for award-winning contemporary dance and BAFTA nominated TV series. His records have been released by Warp Records, Deutsche Grammophon and his own label Throttle Records.

History
Clark was born Christopher Stephen Clark in 1979 in St Albans, Hertfordshire, England, where he grew up and attended St Albans School. He started making music as a teenager, and also began experimenting with building his own primitive equipment, including a "home-built stylus made out of a hook and some masking tape". He went on to attend Bristol University. As a student, his music teacher told him that if Clark were to buy a drum machine, he would give up all hope in Clark's musical ability. Whilst still a student, Clark first impressed staff at Warp Records playing under the moniker Chris From St Albans at their Nesh party in December 2000. He was subsequently signed to Warp, and as Chris Clark released his debut album Clarence Park in April 2001. Clark then moved to Brighton, followed by Birmingham where he stayed for some time, during which he collaborated with Broadcast on a reinterpretation of his track "Herr Barr" and other unreleased material. He currently splits his time between Brighton and Melbourne. With the 2006 release of Throttle Furniture, he shortened his artist name to Clark. His music has been played on BBC Radio 6 Music by Shaun Keaveny, Lauren Laverne and Tom Ravenscroft. He also recorded a mix for Ravenscroft, described by the presenter as "just about the best ever done for the show".

More recently, Clark has focused on score work for film and TV, pursuing it alongside studio albums "because you get options to record with more musicians when you score and I found that was a nice thing to have running alongside the solo work".

Clark has a longstanding creative collaboration with award-winning dance choreographer Melanie Lane, beginning in 2010 with the dance performance/installation Tilted Fawn which later won the 'Dance & Physical Theatre Award' at the Fringe World Awards 2012.

Style
Clark's music is generally considered to fall under the genre of electronic music, although Clark himself finds this label ambiguous and describes Turning Dragon as a "techno album". He often experiments with forms of degradation, distortion and decay associated with different mediums, employing techniques such as re-recording samples and field-recordings in different environments. Describing such processing, he has said  "What I tend to do is just jam stuff through as many boxes as I can, until everything sort of bleeds into itself and all its surrounding parts". Clark plays the drums, and some of his material, especially Body Riddle features recordings of his drumming, often heavily re-sampled.

Live
On describing his live set Clark states "If you see me play, my hands are all over the place – literally I’m doing every single thing. Everything that happens on stage is being played and created live. It’s very interactive. So in that respect, it is very much based on live instrumentation." His set has in the past included a live drummer.

Clark has played a Boiler Room session, played the Berlin club Berghain and the Pritzker Pavilion in Chicago. Festival appearances have included Bang Face, Sónar Tokyo, Sacrum Profanum and Taico Club.

In December 2013 he premiered his live show Phosphor in London.

Videos
Notable music videos for Clark's work include Lynn Fox's video for "Gob Coitus", 1stavemachine's video for "Ted" (selected by Pitchfork as one of the top 50 music videos of 2007), James Healy's video for "Herr Barr", The Vikings' video for "Black Stone", Christopher Hewitt's videos for "Winter Linn" and "To Live And Die in Grantham", and "Peak Magnetic" directed and produced by Sander Houtkruijer.

The video for "Lambent Rag" (2021) was directed and choreographed by frequent collaborator Melanie Lane.

Australian artist Jonathan Zawada expanded the cover art for Playground in a Lake into a music video for "Citrus".

Commissions

Art
Clark contributed music, along with fellow Warp artist Jamie Lidell to a giant interactive projection show at Saatchi & Saatchi's New Director Showcase in 2011.

Clark collaborated with Brighton based artist collective Blast Theory in 2011 on a piece entitled Fixing Point. The piece was an interactive audio walk with music by Clark and deals with the legacy of the conflict in Northern Ireland, in particular the disappearance of Seamus Ruddy. He worked again with the collective on a piece for the Aichi Triennale, contributing his track Black Stone for use in the work.

Dance
During the summer of 2010, he scored a contemporary dance piece titled 'Tilted Fawn' that was performed by Melanie Lane at the Sydney Opera House. The pair also collaborated on a 2013 performance installation Shrine, which trod "the line between dance performance and sculptural installation" and was centred on ideas of ritual and ceremony. They have also worked together on the project Held, which "explores the relationship between memory and the architecture of space that we live in".

Film
The track The Pining Pt.2 from Iradelphic was featured in the 2013 film Elysium. The track Vengeance Drools was used in a domestic violence awareness advertising campaign by Women's Aid, which starred Keira Knightley. In 2019 Clark scored the film Daniel Isn't Real, a psychological horror film directed by Adam Egypt Mortimer. The score features a Budapest Art Orchestra string ensemble, with Headphone Commute describing it as "textural, organic, and incredibly dynamic". The OST was released as an album by Deutsche Grammophon later in 2019.

TV
In 2015 Clark scored the six-part TV series The Last Panthers starring Samantha Morton, John Hurt and Tahar Rahim, broadcast in Europe by Sky Atlantic and Canal+. In 2017, Clark scored the BBC- and Cinemax-co-produced crime drama Rellik, describing the composition as an "elastic, versatile music fabric that I could weave into the series at will". In 2018, Clark scored the minimal, a cappella voice dominated Channel 4/Hulu soundtrack for the mini-series, Kiri. This was followed in June 2021 by the scoring of Lisey's Story, an 8-part miniseries adaptation of Stephen King's novel of the same name. Premiered on Apple TV+, Clark was asked to compose the score by director Pablo Larraín after having heard the Daniel Isn't Real soundtrack.

Clark's original television soundtracks have later been released as standalone records of the same names.

Video games
Clark contributed an unreleased track, "Alice", to the OST for the game Sleeping Dogs. He also contributed to the soundtrack of Driveclub.
The song Winter Linn was added to Watch Dogs 2's soundtrack.

Albums
Clarence Park was Clark's first release and debut full-length album, released on Warp Records in April 2001 under the artist name Chris Clark. The album was named after Clarence Park, a public park in his home city of St Albans. 

Empty the Bones of You was Clark's second full-length, released on Warp Records in September 2003 under the artist name Chris Clark. Reviews noted that Clark had developed a more mature and distinctive voice, and The Mlik Factory described it as "consistent, mature and bloody captivating".

Body Riddle was released on Warp Records in October 2006. The album marked a change in style for Clark, and featured the prominent use of live instrumentation, albeit highly processed. It was well received by critics, with Pitchfork giving it 8.5/10 and Almost Cool giving it 8/10.

Clark's fourth full-length album, Turning Dragon, found Clark exploring a less organic and more mechanised sound, with Pitchfork declaring that it "takes a detour from Clark's ultimate goal of meshing man and machine into one seamless, clattering bundle" and "[it] finds the robots taking the upper hand". The album fared well with critics, with Pitchfork awarding it 8.2/10 and Resident Advisor giving it 4/5. It was released on Warp Records in March 2008.

Totems Flare was released on Warp Records in July 2009.

Iradelphic was released on Warp Records in April 2012. The album was described by The Quietus as "less ethereal, more compact and cohesive" than earlier work. Clark himself commented "Iradelphic is some of the most heartfelt stuff I've ever done, and even though a lot of it is years old, it still really resonates with me."

Feast/Beast was released on Warp Records in September 2013. It predominantly features Clark's remixes of other artists' tracks, amongst them Nathan Fake, Battles, Nils Frahm and Letherette, but also features some reworks of Clark's tracks by other artists.

His self-titled seventh studio album, Clark, was released on 3 November 2014 on Warp Records. The Last Panthers was released on Warp Records in March 2016. Death Peak was released on Warp Records in April 2017. Kiri Variations was released on 26 July 2019, via Throttle Records. Daniel Isn't Real was released on 3 December 2019, via Deutsche Grammophon.

Discography

Albums

 Clarence Park (Warp, 2001)*
 Empty the Bones of You (Warp, 2003)*
 Body Riddle (Warp, 2006)
 Turning Dragon (Warp, 2008)
 Totems Flare (Warp, 2009)
 Iradelphic (Warp, 2012)
 Feast / Beast (Remix Compilation Album, 2013)
 Clark (Warp, 2014)
 The Last Panthers (Warp, 2016)
 Death Peak (Warp, 2017)
 Kiri Variations (Throttle Records, 2019)[51]
 Daniel Isn't Real (Deutsche Grammophon, 2019)
 Playground in a Lake (Deutsche Grammophon, 2021)
 05-10 (Warp, 2022)

EPs and singles

 Ceramics Is The Bomb (2001)*
 Throttle Furniture (2006)
 Throttle Clarence (2006)
 Ted E.P. (2007)
 Throttle Promoter (2007)
 Growls Garden (2009)
 Willenhall / Baskerville Grinch (2011), a Record Store Day split 12" with Bibio
 Fantasm Planes (2012)
 Superscope (2014)
 Flame Rave (2015)
 The Last Panthers (2016)
 A Badman Sound / Heath Town / Inf Inf Inf Inf (2016), a Record Store Day split 12" with Mark Pritchard and Bibio
 Bobbie Caris / Idle Withdrawal (2017), a split 12" with Com Truise
 Rellik EP (2017)
 Honey Badger / Pig (2017)
 E.C.S.T. T.R.A.X. (2018)
 Branding Problem (2019)
 Small (2021)
 Forever Chemicals / Lambent Rag (2021)

*originally released as Chris Clark.

References

External links
 
 
 

 

1979 births
Living people
English electronic musicians
Intelligent dance musicians
Remixers
Musicians from St Albans
Warp (record label) artists
Deutsche Grammophon artists
Musicians from Hertfordshire